Earth to Luna!  (Portuguese: O Show da Luna!) is a flash-animated children's television series created and directed by Célia Catunda and Kiko Mistrorigo and produced by TV PinGuim, and premiered on the American channel Sprout, on August 16, 2014 to November 24, 2022. In Latin America, it debuted on October 13, 2014 to November 24, 2022, on Discovery Kids. The first season consisted of 24 episodes, each 15 minutes long. The target audience is children between the ages of 4 and 9 years old.

Summary 
The series shows the adventures of Luna, a young girl (voiced by Angelina Carballo and singing voice by Hannah Strawn) who is in love with science, her little brother Jupiter (who's named after the planet Jupiter) (voiced by Raul-Gomez Pina) and their pet ferret Clyde (voiced by Eric Anderson, and vocals by Frank Welker).

Voice cast 
 Angelina Carballo and Alexya Avila - Luna
 Hannah Strawn and Alexya Avila - Luna (singing voice)
 Raul-Gomez Pina - Jupiter
 Eric Anderson - Clyde
 Frank Welker provides Clyde's vocal effects.
 Dubbing Studio: The Kitchen, Miami

Episodes

Awards

References

2010s Brazilian television series
2010s Brazilian animated television series
2014 Brazilian television series debuts
2010s preschool education television series
Brazilian flash animated television series
Brazilian children's animated comic science fiction television series
Brazilian children's animated science fantasy television series
Animated musical television series
Animated preschool education television series
Portuguese-language television shows
English-language television shows
Discovery Kids original programming
Universal Kids original programming
Animated television series about children
Animated television series about siblings
Fictional scientists
Animated television series about mammals
Fictional ferrets
Television series about shapeshifting